KEZR (106.5 FM, "Mix 106.5") is a radio station licensed to San Jose, California and serving the San Francisco Bay Area. They program an Adult Top 40 format and are owned by Alpha Media through the licensee Alpha Media Licensee LLC. Co-owned with KBAY, its studios are located in South San Jose just off US 101 on Hellyer Ave, and the transmitter is based from a site in Santa Teresa County Park.

History
KEZR debuted in 1967 as KPLX, under the ownership of Bay Area broadcasting legend Les Malloy, from studios in the Hotel Sainte Claire in downtown San Jose. In December 1971, Malloy sold the station to PSA Broadcasting, a subsidiary of San Diego-based Pacific Southwest Airlines, for $330,000. In mid-1973, KPSJ's call letters were changed to KEZR; those call letters remained with the station into 2000s.

The station has programmed minor variations of adult contemporary music with the KEZR call letters since 1973.

This popular San Jose radio station has held many mixers and events with several famous artists including Sara Bareilles, Jason Mraz, and Augustana.

Before it was purchased by NextMedia Group, the station was briefly owned by CBS Radio, who moved the station from San Jose to San Francisco. Prior to that, it was owned for a long period by the Levitt family. During this period, particularly the 1990s, KEZR was a dominant force in Bay Area radio, regularly topping the Arbitron ratings.

NextMedia sold their 33 radio stations to Digity, LLC for a purchase price of $85 million; the transaction was consummated on February 10, 2014.

Effective February 25, 2016, Digity, LLC and its 124 radiostations were acquired by Alpha Media for $264 million.

External links
Official Website

EZR
Radio stations established in 1967
Alpha Media radio stations
Mass media in San Jose, California